The 2013–14 FC Anzhi Makhachkala season was the 4th successive season that Anzhi played in the Russian Premier League, the highest tier of football in Russia, in which they suffered relegation after finishing the season in 16th place. They were knocked out of the Russian Cup at the Round of 32 stage by Alania Vladikavkaz, and they reached the Last 16 of the Europa League where they were defeated  by AZ.

Season review
Anzhi started the season in the same manor as the previous season, entering the transfer market and signing Igor Denisov from Zenit Saint Petersburg, Aleksei Ionov from Kuban Krasnodar, Aleksandr Kokorin from Dynamo Moscow and resigning Christopher Samba from QPR. Following a draw and a defeat in their opening two games, Guus Hiddink resigned as manager on 22 July 2013.

Recently appointed Assistant Coach Rene Meulensteen was then put in charge of the team in a caretaker capacity until 8 August 2013, when Gadzhi Gadzhiyev was appointed as the club's manager for a fifth time. The previous day, the club confirmed that Kerimov had decided to make drastic cuts to the team's budget, and the club's president, Konstantin Remchukov, suggested on Twitter that "a lot of expensive players will leave". As a result, Igor Denisov, Yuri Zhirkov and Aleksandr Kokorin, before Kokorin had made his debut, all left Anzhi in a package deal for Dynamo Moscow whilst Oleg Shatov left the club shortly after joining Zenit St. Petersburg.
These sales prompted the club to recall Nikita Burmistrov and Serder Serderov from their loan deals, before Mbark Boussoufa and Lassana Diarra then joined Lokomotiv Moscow. On 29 August Arseniy Logashov joined Lokomotiv Moscow, whilst Vladimir Gabulov, Christopher Samba and Aleksei Ionov all joined Dynamo Moscow, and Samuel Eto'o joined Chelsea.

Squad

Transfers

In

Loans in

Out

Loans out

Released

Friendlies

Competitions

Overview

Premier League

Results summary

Results by round

Results

League table

Russian Cup

UEFA Europa League

Group stage

Knockout phase

Squad statistics

Appearances and goals

|-
|colspan="14"|Players away from the club on loan:
|-
|colspan="14"|Players who appeared for Anzhi Makhachkala no longer at the club:

|}

Goal Scorers

Clean Sheets

Disciplinary Record

References

External links
Official website
Fans' website 
A fan is a club Anji

FC Anzhi Makhachkala seasons
Anzhi Makhachkala
Anzhi Makhachkala